Lake St. Clair is a freshwater lake that lies between the Canadian province of Ontario and the U.S. state of Michigan. It was named in 1679 by French Catholic explorers after Saint Clare of Assisi, on whose feast day they first saw the lake. 

It is part of the Great Lakes system, and along with the St. Clair River and Detroit River, Lake St. Clair connects Lake Huron (to the north) with Lake Erie (to the south).

Geography
Along with the St. Clair River and Detroit River, Lake St. Clair connects Lake Huron (to its north) with Lake Erie (to its south). The area  is notable for the fact that the Canadian territory around the lake (Windsor metropolitan area) lies south of the adjacent United States territory.

The lake is fed by the St. Clair River, which flows to the south from Lake Huron and has an extensive river delta where it enters Lake St. Clair. This is the largest delta of the Great Lakes System. 

Other rivers which feed Lake St. Clair are the Thames and Sydenham rivers which originate in Southwestern Ontario, and the Clinton River, which originates in Michigan. The outflow from Lake St. Clair travels from its southwestern end into the Detroit River, and then into Lake Erie.

The tarry time (i.e. the time between entering and leaving) of the water in Lake St. Clair averages about seven days, but this can vary from as little as two to as many as thirty days, depending on the direction of the winds, the water circulation patterns, and the amount of water that is flowing out of Lake Huron. For water flowing through the navigation channel, the time period is only about two days.

Lake St. Clair is part of the Great Lakes system, but it is 17 times smaller than Lake Ontario by surface area, and more than 80 times by volume. It is rarely included in the list of "Great Lakes" but is sometimes referred to as "the sixth Great Lake". Scattered proposals have called for it to be officially recognized as a Great Lake, which might enable it to attract greater public funding for scientific research and other projects.

Naming

First Nations/Native Americans used the lake as part of their extensive navigation of the Great Lakes. The Mississauga called it , meaning "(at) the whirlpool". The Wea derived their name from a Miami cognate: . 

In the latter part of the 17th century, the Mississauga established a village near the lake. Early French mapmakers had identified the lake by a variety of French and Iroquoian-language names, including  [Seawater Lake]; Lac Ganatchio ("kettle," for its shape), in French . A variety of Native names were associated with sweetness, as the lake was freshwater as opposed to saltwater. These included Otsiketa (sugar or candy), Kandequio or Kandekio (possibly candy), Oiatinatchiketo (probably a form of Otsiketa), and Oiatinonchikebo. Similarly, the Iroquois nations called present-day Lake Huron a term meaning "The Grand Lake of the Sweet Sea" (fresh water as opposed to salt water.) 

On August 12, 1679, the French explorer René Robert Cavelier, Sieur de La Salle arrived with an expedition. He named the body of water Lac Sainte-Claire, as the expedition sighted it on the feast day of Saint Clare of Assisi. The historian on the voyage, Louis Hennepin, recorded that the Iroquoian tribes referred to the lake as Otseketa.

As early as 1710, the English adopted the French name, identifying the lake on their maps as Saint Clare. By the Mitchell Map in 1755, the spelling appeared as the shorter "St. Clair," the form that became most widely used. Some scholars credit the name as honoring the American Revolutionary War General Arthur St. Clair, later Governor of the Northwest Territory, but the name Lake St. Clair was in use with this current spelling long before St. Clair became a notable figure. Together the place name and general's name likely influenced settlers' naming a proliferation of nearby political jurisdictions: the Michigan county and township of St. Clair, as well as the cities of St. Clair and St. Clair Shores.

Some local historians attributed the namesake to Patrick Sinclair, a British officer who purchased land on the St. Clair River at the outlet of the Pine River. There, in 1764, he built Fort Sinclair, which was in use for nearly twenty years before being abandoned.

Unlike most smaller lakes in the region—but like the Great Lakes—Lake comes at the front of its proper name, rather than the end; this is reflective of its French origins.

Water quality
Lake St Clair's location, downstream from the largest freshwater delta in the Great Lakes, has a large effect on its turbidity (clarity). Current water quality is quite good despite past incidents and a history of chemical bio-accumulation. A number of cities source drinking water from or just downstream of the lake and quality is closely monitored.

In the early 1970s, the Canadian and American governments closed the commercial fishery over concerns of bio-accumulation of mercury. The industry responsible for this contamination was the Dow Chemical Chlor-Alkali Plant in Sarnia, Ontario. Since 1949, Dow Chemical had been operating mercury cell plants for the production of chlorine and other chemicals. Through its production process, it discharged mercury into the river and contaminated the fishery. The fishery has since not been re-opened, although studies have now confirmed mercury levels are well within the safe range.

Sport fishing remains popular in the lake. The governments on both sides of the lakes continue to monitor and publish guides for sport fish consumption.

Boat clubs

Many yacht clubs (boating and sailing clubs) are located along the shores. Some of these include:
 The Great Lakes Yacht Club, St. Clair Shores, Michigan
 Grosse Pointe Yacht Club in Grosse Pointe Shores, Michigan
 The Old Club, on Harsens Island, Michigan
North Channel Yacht Club, on Harsens Island, Michigan
 Crescent Sail Yacht Club in Grosse Pointe Farms, Michigan
 Grosse Pointe Club (Little Club) in Grosse Pointe, Michigan
 Clinton River Boat Club (Club Island), near Harsens Island, Michigan
 Albatross Yacht Club, Anchor Bay, Michigan
 North Star Sail Club, on the Clinton River, Harrison Twp, Michigan
 Lake St. Clair Powerboat Club, Saint Clair Shores, Michigan
 Lakeshore Sail Club, St. Clair Shores, Michigan
 Windsor Yacht Club in Windsor, Ontario
 Southport Sailing Club, Windsor, Ontario
 St. Clair Sail Club, Belle River (now Lakeshore), Ontario
 Thames River Yacht Club, Lighthouse Cove (now Lakeshore), Ontario

Public beaches

 Mitchell's Bay Beach, Mitchell's Bay, Ontario, is a small community located on the east shore of Lake St. Clair. 
 New Baltimore, beach at Walter and Mary Burke Park in Downtown New Baltimore, Michigan.
 Sandpoint Beach, located in Windsor, Ontario near Riverside Dr. East and Florence Ave.
 Lakeview Park West Beach, located in Belle River, Ontario. The shallow water is great for cooling down in the summer.
 Marine City Beach, north end of Water Street in Marine City, Michigan.
 Lake St Clair Metropark, Harrison Township, Michigan.
 Belle Isle Beach, Belle Isle, Michigan; located on the west side of the island, this beach provides a safe swimming area away from the currents of the Detroit River. The beach is well manicured with clear water and sandy bottom. Nice shade trees and grass border the beach.

See also

Detroit River
St. Clair River
Thames River (Ontario)
Sydenham River (Lake Saint Clair)
Clinton River (Michigan)
Milk River (Michigan)
St. Clair Flats Front and Rear Range Light
Clinton–Kalamazoo Canal
Swamplands Act of 1850
Tourism in metropolitan Detroit
Tecumseh, Ontario
Grosse Pointe
Harsens Island
Belle Isle Park (Michigan)

References

External links

Description of Bathymetry of Lake Erie & Lake St. Clair, NGDC
Poster showing Bathymetry of Lake Erie & Lake St. Clair
National Data Buoy Center page for Lake St. Clair station LSCM4 Current weather conditions from NOAA
EPA.gov: Grosse Ile walleye contamination

 
St. Clair, Lake
Great Lakes Waterway
St. Clair, Lake
St. Clair, Lake
Landforms of Chatham-Kent
Geography of Detroit
Landforms of Essex County, Ontario
Landforms of Lambton County
Bodies of water of Macomb County, Michigan
Bodies of water of St. Clair County, Michigan
Bodies of water of Wayne County, Michigan
Landforms of Windsor, Ontario
Canada–United States border
Saint Clair, Lake
Detroit River
St. Clair River
Tributaries of Lake Erie